GrooveLily is an American musical trio based in New York City notable for creative songwriting in different pop genres, such as rock, folk, jazz, and show tune. The band consists of Valerie Vigoda and Brendan Milburn along with Gene Lewin. A report in The New York Times in 2004 described the group as an "up and coming trio". According to Variety, GrooveLily was founded by Vigoda.

A review of their 2006 performance of A Midsummer Night's Dream described their show as having "plenty of fun" with "original music" from GrooveLily, but noted problems with acoustics. In 2008, Milburn & Vigoda wrote seven musical numbers for the Disney Wonder cruise ship production of Toy Story: The Musical. In 2002 (and in subsequent years, opening off-Broadway in 2006), GrooveLily performed a holiday musical entitled Striking 12. A Washington Post reviewer described it as an "engaging concert-style entertainment" and fusion of "cabaret act and chamber musical". Milburn & Vigoda wrote the book, music and lyrics along with Rachel Sheinkin. Variety gave Striking 12 a mixed review, saying the show's "lame wit obscures its moments of beauty" and that the trio's "politeness hinders the supposedly rebellious humor."

After years of very few GrooveLily performances, the band came together to write and perform a musical called Wheelhouse about their earlier touring career on the road in a Winnebago and why they stopped touring largely because of that experience. The show premiered at TheatreWorks Silicon Valley June 6, 2012.

Albums

References

External links
Groovelily's official website

American pop music groups